Listroptera is a genus of beetles in the family Cerambycidae, containing the following species:

 Listroptera carbonaria Chevrolat, 1855
 Listroptera tenebricosa (Olivier, 1790)

References

Rhopalophorini